Charaxes anticlea, the small flame-bordered charaxes, is a butterfly in the family Nymphalidae. It is found in Senegal, Guinea-Bissau, Guinea, Sierra Leone, Liberia, Ivory Coast, Ghana, Togo, Nigeria, Cameroon, Gabon, the Republic of the Congo, the Central African Republic, Angola, the Democratic Republic of the Congo, Uganda, Kenya, Tanzania and Zambia.

Description

Ch. anticlea Drury male: wings above deep black; forewing at the hinder angle between the hind
margin and vein 3 with a triangular orange submarginal band, which is only 1 mm. from the distal margin; hindwing above with an orange band, anteriorly narrower, in the middle about 8 mm. in breadth, which encloses 4—6 black, white-centred submarginal spots; above strongly recalls the male of protoclea In the female the wings are black-brown above, with a common, nearly straight, light orange median band, which on the hindwing is 9 mm. in breadth and in cellules 5—7 of the forewing is divided into two branches; hindwing with a continuous orange marginal line only about 2 mm. in breadth. Sierra Leone and Ashanti. — adusta Rothsch. 
only differs in the male in having the orange submarginal band of the forewing 2 mm. from the distal margin and in the female in the orange marginal line of the hindwing being partly broken up into spots. Gameroons to Angola and Uganda.
A full description is also given by Walter Rothschild and Karl Jordan, 1900 Novitates Zoologicae Volume 7:287-524.  page 492 et seq. (for terms see Novitates Zoologicae Volume 5:545-601 )

Biology

The habitat consists of forests, including dry forests, and dense riverine vegetation.

Both sexes are attracted to rotting fruit and tree sap.

The larvae feed on Acacia poetzi, Acacia pennata, Mezoneuron benthamianum, Acacia goetzei, Acacia brevispica, Mezoneuron welwitschianum and Mezoneuron angolense.

Subspecies
Charaxes anticlea anticlea (Senegal, Guinea-Bissau, Guinea, Sierra Leone, Liberia, Ivory Coast, Ghana, Togo, Nigeria)
Charaxes anticlea adusta Rothschild, 1900 (Democratic Republic of the Congo, Uganda, western Tanzania)
Charaxes anticlea mwera Vingerhoedt & Thiry, 1996 (Democratic Republic of the Congo: Shaba)
Charaxes anticlea proadusta van Someren, 1971 (Nigeria, Cameroon, Gabon, Congo, western Central African Republic, northern Angola, Democratic Republic of the Congo, Zambia
Charaxes anticlea suna van Someren, 1975(south-western Kenya)

Taxonomy
Charaxes anticlea is a member of the large species group Charaxes etheocles

Realm
Afrotropical realm

References

Victor Gurney Logan Van Someren, 1971 Revisional notes on African Charaxes (Lepidoptera: Nymphalidae). Part VII. Bulletin of the British Museum (Natural History) (Entomology)181-226.

External links
Images of C. anticlea adusta Royal Museum for Central Africa (Albertine Rift Project)
Images of C. anticlea mwera Royal Museum for Central Africa (Albertine Rift Project)
Images of C.anticlea proadusta Royal Museum for Central Africa (Albertine Rift Project)
Images of C. anticlea suna Royal Museum for Central Africa (Albertine Rift Project)
Charaxes anticlea images at Charaxes page Consortium for the Barcode of Life subspecies and forms
African Butterfly Database Range map via search

Butterflies described in 1782
anticlea